Pa Amat Dibba (born 15 October 1987) is a Gambian professional footballer who plays as a forward for Turkish Club Eyüpspor.

Career

Early career
Dibba was born in Gambia but moved to Sweden with his family at age seven. The family settled in Brandbergen, near Stockholm. As a youth player he spent time with Hammarby IF, FOC Farsta and Enskede IK before eventually playing first team football with Brandbergens IF.

Brandbergens IF were playing in the ninth tier of Swedish football at the time but would make a quick rise to the fifth tier during Dibba's years with the club. At the start of 2011 Dibba trialed with Hammarby IF feeder club Hammarby Talang FF. They were interested in signing him but didn't have room in their squad at the time. Dibba instead remained at Brandbergen for the first half of the season and then trialed with Superettan side GIF Sundsvall during the summer, where he was eventually signed to a 3.5 year deal.

GIF Sundsvall
He soon established himself as a frequent starter in Sundsvall. Between 2011 and 2016 he would make 132 appearances for the yo-yo club in both Allsvenskan and Superettan, scoring 34 competitive goals. On the 19 November 2014 Pa signed a new contract with GIF Sundsvall lasting until 2016.

With only six months left of this contract, Dibba attracted the attention from fellow Allsvenskan team Hammarby IF during the 2016 midseason. He completed a transfer to the Stockholm-based club, where he previously had been on trial, on 8 August 2016.

Hammarby IF
He made his debut for Hammarby a week later in an away fixture against Sundsvall, the team he just had left. The appearance sparked some controversy as the Sundsvall staff claimed the two clubs had reached a spoken "gentlemen's agreement" that Dibba would not feature in this particular game. However, the deal was later denied by officials from Hammarby in a statement on their website. On 26 September 2016, Dibba scored his first goal in Allsvenskan for Hammarby against Falkenbergs FF on away turf in a 2–0 win.

On 17 April 2017, Dibba scored the decisive goal as Hammarby won against fierce rivals AIK. He settled the score at 2–1 in the later stages of the game, citing "it had been a dream to determine a derby".

Dibba had his major breakthrough in 2018, scoring 7 goals in 10 matches, as Hammarby was placed first in the league mid-season. He was voted "Allsvenskan Player of the Month" in May.

Shenzhen FC
On 28 June 2018, Dibba joined Chinese club Shenzhen F.C. He signed a three-year contract with the China League One club, as reports suggested a transfer fee of around 12 million Swedish kronor (approximately £1 million).

Shanghai Shenxin
In February 2019, Dibba was loaned to China League One side Shanghai Shenxin for the 2019 season.

Personal life
Dibba has a total of 14 siblings. Even though he has lived the majority of his life in Sweden, it was his dream to represent the Gambia national football team.

He is a supporter of Real Madrid and names the Brazilian striker Ronaldo as his football idol.

In August 2017, R&B artist Madi Banja released a single called "Pa Dibba". The duo are personal friends and share Gambian heritage.

Career statistics

International
International
Scores and results list the Gambia's goal tally first.

References

External links
 
 
 
 Eliteprospects profile

1987 births
Living people
Gambian footballers
Association football forwards
GIF Sundsvall players
Hammarby Fotboll players
Shenzhen F.C. players
Shanghai Shenxin F.C. players
China League One players
Allsvenskan players
Superettan players
Swedish footballers
Gambian emigrants to Sweden
The Gambia international footballers
People from Farafenni
Enskede IK players
Gambian expatriate footballers
Expatriate footballers in China
Expatriate footballers in Turkey
Adana Demirspor footballers